FlexGen is a United States energy storage technology company. The company is headquartered in Durham, North Carolina and was founded in 2009.

FlexGen is the developer of the FlexGen HybridOS energy management system, which is capable of automating the dispatch of energy storage, renewable, and conventional power generation to provide enhanced capability and lower cost of energy.

FlexGen originally designed energy storage products for the United States Military, these hybrid power systems were sold to the US Marine Corps, US Army, US Navy SEALs, and the Joint Special Operations Forces-Afghanistan. Systems that were fielded in those military branches showed at least 52% reduction in fuel consumption and an 80% reduction in generator runtime.

Venture Capital Funding 
On August 3, 2015, FlexGen Power Systems completed a $25.5M Series A venture capital funding round. Led by Denver-based Altira Group, the venture funding round also included investments from General Electric Ventures and Caterpillar Ventures.

On August 25, 2021, it was announced that Apollo Global Management Inc. invested $150M into FlexGen.

References

External links 
 www.flexgen.com: Official website

Energy storage
Electrical generators
Energy companies of the United States 
Technology companies of the United States
Manufacturing companies based in Texas
Companies based in Houston
American companies established in 2009
Energy companies established in 2009
Manufacturing companies established in 2009
Non-renewable resource companies established in 2009
Technology companies established in 2009
2009 establishments in Texas
Petroleum in Texas